TOYA is a Polish cable and digital television and telecommunications provider with headquarters in Łódź. The company's network covers eight cities – Łódź, Kraków, Mysłowice, Kutno, Przemyśl, Piotrków Trybunalski, Pisz and Pabianice. TOYA products and services are also available in thirteen partner networks of other operators across 25 locations. Apart from delivering cable and digital TV, Internet access and VoIP, the company runs several media and cultural projects.

History and development 
The limited company was founded in 1991 in Łódź by Witold Krawczyk and Jacek Kobierzycki. It was one of the first Polish companies permitted to offer Internet services – as early as 1999; the following year it had 1000 subscribers. In 2004 the service was extended to include subscribers in Przemyśl and Mysłowice.

By early 2006, TOYA's network in the eight cities covered over 80% of the area of each city. In October 2008, TOYA took over Pol-Net – a cable TV company from Piotrków Trybunalski; in 2017 it acquired the Kraków-based T-MONT.

According to the Polish Chamber for Electronic Communication (PIKE), the number of TOYA's subscribers in March 2010 was approximately 160,000 – the company came fourth on the list of the largest cable network operators in Poland. The 2017 PIKE statistics position TOYA in fifth place, with 175,000 subscribers in July. Additionally, the company provides access to its services to around 90,000 subscribers of partner networks.

TOYA was the first Polish cable TV provider to offer triple play (Internet, telephone, and TV) model packages to its customers.

Products and services

Television 

The company delivers over 250 television channels both via analog TV and its own High Definition digital platform.

Internet 
TOYA delivers Internet connections based on the DOCSIS technology. The company offers its customers a variety of Internet packages of varying speeds (from 6 to 250 Mbit/s). Internet signal is transmitted through Motorola and Cisco cable modems. According to a ranking by Speedtest.pl, in 2017 TOYA offered the fastest cable broadband Internet in Poland.

VoIP 

TOYA provides VoIP telephony.

Mobile services 

TOYA offers mobile phone and mobile Internet connections via the PLAY network.

Toya Group

TV TOYA

TOYA Studios 

TOYA Studios are a group of recording, production and post-production studios for both audio and film. The studios are located at Łąkowa 29 in Łódź and previously belonged to the Łódź Feature Film Studios, which operated between 1945 and 1998 and produced a number of award-winning postwar pictures directed by Jerzy Kawalerowicz, Krzysztof Kieślowski, Roman Polanski and many others. The studio complex has been revitalized and now consists of sixteen studio and sound edit suites and two large halls which can accommodate up to 1200 and up to 2500 people. The studios deliver a few hundred hours of new audio for films and other productions every month, and have produced sound for over two hundred contemporary feature films.

Wytwórnia Club 

Wytwórnia Club belongs to the Toya Group and is one of the largest, most active and progressive music and arts venues in Łódź. The club runs a regular programme of around 100 events per year, including music concerts, festivals, film screenings, theatrical performances and art exhibitions. Artists who performed at Wytwórnia include Jan Garbarek, Tomasz Stańko, Chris Botti, Courtney Love, Michał Urbaniak, Al Di Meola and Gary Numan.

References 

Telecommunications companies of Poland
Cable television companies
Polish brands
Companies based in Łódź
Polish companies established in 1991
Telecommunications companies established in 1991
Polish Limited Liability Companies